Chanzy may refer to:

 Chanzy (instrument), a type of three-stringed Mongolian lute from the Tuvan Republic
 Chanzy, an alternative name for Sidi-Ali-Ben-Joub, Algeria, the possible location of ancient Castra Severiana
 Antoine Chanzy (1823–1883), French general
 , a French Navy cruiser in commission from 1894 to 1907